Hildreth is an unincorporated community in Suwannee County, Florida, United States.

References

Unincorporated communities in Suwannee County, Florida
Unincorporated communities in Florida